Rusk Rehabilitation is the world's first and among the largest university-affiliated academic centers devoted entirely to inpatient/outpatient care, research, and training in rehabilitation medicine for both adults and pediatric patients. The system is part of the NYU Langone Medical Center and operated under the auspices of the Department of Rehabilitation Medicine of the New York University School of Medicine. The Rusk Institute is named in honor of its founder, Howard A. Rusk. 

The Rusk Institute has been voted the best rehabilitation hospital in New York and among the top ten in the country since 1989, when U.S. News & World Report introduced its annual "Best Hospitals" rankings. 

 Steven Flanagan is the chairman of rehabilitation medicine and medical director of the Rusk Institute.

History
Dr. Howard A. Rusk founded the Institute for Rehabilitation Medicine in 1948. His experience treating wounded soldiers during World War II led him to develop the institute around the philosophy that the patients are to be cared for as an entire person, not only the physical disability or illness. In 1984, the institute was renamed so in his honor.

Facilities
Rusk is based out of its wing of the NYU Langone Main Campus, but additionally provides rehabilitation services at three other main locations and nearly a dozen other satellite locations:

 Langone Orthopedic Hospital at 301 East 17th Street (inpatient adult rehab and inpatient and outpatient pediatric rehab)
 Ambulatory Care Center at 240 East 38th Street (outpatient adult rehab)
 Langone Orthopedic Center at 333 East 38th Street (outpatient adult orthopedic/musculoskeletal rehab)

See also
 The New York Foundation
 Muriel Zimmerman

References

External links
 Rusk Institute of Rehabilitation Medicine official website
 Alcohol and Drugs Recovery Center

New York University
Kips Bay, Manhattan